Thug in Thug Out is a collaborative studio album by American rappers Young Noble and Hussein Fatal from hip-hop group Outlawz, released September 11, 2007 on High Powered/Koch Records.

Track listing

External links

References

2007 albums
Young Noble albums
Hussein Fatal albums
Outlawz albums
Albums produced by Cozmo
E1 Music albums
Outlaw Recordz albums
Collaborative albums